Enaliornis is a genus of hesperornithine which lived in the early Late Cretaceous, making them the oldest known hesperornithines. Fossils have been found near Cambridge, England. Due to its lack of certain hesperornithid apomorphies, they were much more "conventional" birds and were initially held to be Gaviiformes (loons/divers).

Description
Based on the remnants that have been studied, it has not been determined if these birds had teeth like the others from this order. However, they were believed to not have well-developed wings. Like other hesperornithines, they probably had lobed feet for swimming, rather than webbed feet.

Classification
Enaliornis was originally named Pelagornis ("sea bird") by Seeley in 1866, but that name was preoccupied by a Miocene bird related to the pelicans. Three species have been described: the small Enaliornis sedgwicki, the medium-sized Enaliornis seeleyi, and the large Enaliornis barretti.

The size of the largest of the three species was comparable to a large pigeon. Together, they are the only birds currently assigned to the family Enaliornithidae.  The presumed  hesperornithine Potamornis from the Late Cretaceous Lance Formation of Buck Creek (United States) may also be related to this group.

References

Sources
 
 
 

 

Cretaceous birds of Europe
Hesperornitheans
Bird genera